Upper Guinea Creoles can refer to:

Guinea-Bissau Creole — Creole spoken in Guinea-Bissau
Cape Verdean Creole — Creole spoken in Cape Verde

Also related
Portuguese-based creole languages — creole languages with Portuguese as the lexifier language